Curtana, also known as the Sword of Mercy, is a ceremonial sword used at the coronation of British kings and queens. One of the Crown Jewels of the United Kingdom, its end is blunt and squared to symbolise mercy.

Description

About  of the steel blade's tip is missing. The blade features a decorative "running wolf" mark which originated in the town of Passau, Lower Bavaria, Germany. It has a gilt-iron hilt, a wooden grip bound in wire, and a leather sheath bound in crimson velvet with gold embroidery. The sheath has been remade several times since the 17th century, and the current one was made in 1937.

The Curtana has a squared tip. It is used in the procession alongside two other pointed swords. The Curtana once had a jagged edge like a naturally broken tip, but this was squared off at some time. At one time, the other two could be distinguished by their points: the sharply-pointed Sword of Temporal Justice, and the more obtuse Sword of Spiritual Justice.

History
There are several swords answering to this description. The original is thought to be the same as the unnamed regalia sword purported to be the sword of Tristan, although he may be a fictional character contrived by a bard. The original may also be the sword of Edward the Confessor, although this provenance is debated. The later copy of Curtana was made in the 17th century.

Angevin dynasty

The name Curtana or Curtein (from the Latin Curtus, meaning short) appears on record for the first time in accounts of the coronation of Queen Eleanor of Provence in 1236 when Henry III of England married the queen. It occurs as "Curtana" in the "Red Book of the Exchequer" as one of the three swords used in the coronation services; and called "Curtein" in the Chronicle of 13th century monk Matthew Paris, in which he identifies it with the "Sword of Edward the Confessor".

This sword may be the same as the so-called "Tristram's sword", kept as part of the regalia according to earlier Angevin dynasty records. An inventory for two swords, "namely Tristan's sword ( Tristrami)" and one other, is recorded in the patent roll for the year 1207, where King John issued a receipt for them. Any credible relic claiming to be "Tristram's sword" would have to be broken-tipped, since the Tristan of romance had his sword damaged in combat with Morholt, with the tip lodged in the enemy's skull. Therefore, according to Roger Sherman Loomis, the inference can be made with "little doubt" that this was in fact the sword later called Curtana.

Although Tristan's sword had no name in early Tristan and Iseult romances, in the Prose Tristan (1230–1235, and 1240) Tristan's broken sword was inherited and called "Cortain" by Ogier the Dane, one of Charlemagne's paladins. This has been regarded as corroborative evidence by Loomis for his theory. E. M. R. Ditmas had called Loomis's theory "attractive", but contextualized the relevance of the Prose Tristan differently than Loomis in a later paper.

It has also been suggested that the name of the regalia sword "Curtana" might have been borrowed directly from Ogier's sword "Cortain", which is also spelt "Cortana" or "Curtana" in Italian renditions.

Dating the sword
The original sword's dating cannot be fixed, and opinions vary among commentators on since when it may have existed. According to Matthew Paris, the sword was known as that of Edward the Confessor (reigned 1042–1066). Some have taken this at face value, for example, James Planché. Others discount the possibility (E. M. R. Ditmas), and it may have resulted from confusion: there certainly had been St. Edward's effects which were removed from the grave and preserved as regalia, but this did not include a sword.

Martin Aurell suggests in his New Interpretation the sword was made by Henry II for his son John Lackland, on the occasion in 1177 of investing John with lordship over Ireland, the sword being the one with which the Irish giant Morholt was defeated. Matthew Strickland thought it was "probably" used in the two coronations of Henry the Young King, in 1154 and 1170. It is known that at Richard I's coronation "three royal swords.. from the king's treasury", with scabbards covered in gold were carried by three earls in the procession.

Earl of Chester
Until the 14th century, it was the job of the Earl of Chester to carry the sword before the monarch at his or her coronation. Today, another high-ranking peer of the realm is chosen by the monarch for this privilege. When not in use, the sword is on display with the other Crown Jewels in the Jewel House at the Tower of London.

Sword of Mercy
The meaning attributed to Curtana and the other two British coronation swords shifted over time. During Henry IV meanings were assigned to the swords of the coronation ceremony, but initially, Curtana was said to signify the "Sword of Justice". Eventually, however, Curtana's blunt edge was taken to represent mercy, and it thus came to be known as the Sword of Mercy, as it is known today. Curtana's designation as the "Sword of Mercie" goes at least as far back as Henry VI's coronation.

17th-century reproduction of Curtana
The "current" Curtana was made between 1610 and 1620, likely by Robert South, a member of the Worshipful Company of Cutlers, and was supplied for Charles I's coronation in 1626, whereafter it joined the coronation regalia kept at Westminster Abbey. For almost 200 years until then, a new sword had been usually made for each coronation. Its blade was created in the 1580s by Italian bladesmiths Giandonato and Andrea Ferrara and imported into England from Italy. Together with two Swords of Justice and the Coronation Spoon, it is one of the few pieces of the Crown Jewels to have survived the English Civil War intact, having been sold to Roger Humphreys for £5 in 1649. It is not clear if the swords were used by Charles II, but they have been used continuously since the coronation of his successor James II in 1685.

Explanatory notes

References

Citations

Bibliography 

 

 Alt URL

Formal insignia
Matter of France
Medieval European swords
Mythological swords
Regalia
Crown Jewels of the United Kingdom
Individual weapons